In Towers and Clouds is the first and only album released by the Dublin quartet The Immediate. The album received generally positive reviews on its launch and was nominated  for the 2007 Choice Music Prize.

Shortly after the album's launch, Jim Carroll, a journalist with the Irish Times, wrote an article in the newspaper's weekly entertainment supplement praising the band for choosing to release the album independently. He described the album as containing "cracking songs" and one "which gets bigger, better, bolder and brighter with every listen". This was in contrast with another Dublin based band Humanzi whose major label debut was considered a disaster. After the group's disbandment critics collectively regarded In Towers & Clouds as the finest Irish debut album in the past decade.

The band performed "A Ghost in This House" at the 2007 Meteor Awards.

Track listing
"Aspects"
"Lonely Locked Up"
"Fashion or Faith"
"Big Sad Eyes"
"Don't You Ever"
"Stop and Remember"
"You Reflected"
"Let This Light Fill Your Eyes"
"A Ghost in This House"
"In Towers and Clouds"
"Can't Stop Moving"

Singles
"Stop and Remember"

References

External links
Band Myspace
Official website

2006 debut albums
The Immediate albums
Fantastic Plastic Records albums